The Shire of Newstead was a local government area about  northwest of Melbourne, the state capital of Victoria, Australia.

History

Newstead was first incorporated as a road district on 12 October 1860, and became a shire on 7 March 1865.

On 20 January 1995, the Shire of Newstead was abolished, and along with the City of Castlemaine and the Shires of Maldon and Metcalfe, was merged into the newly created Shire of Mount Alexander.

Wards

The Shire of Newstead was divided into four ridings, each of which elected three councillors:
 Campbells Creek Riding
 Fryers Riding
 Loddon Riding
 South Riding

Towns and localities
 Cairn Curran Reservoir
 Campbells Creek
 Campbelltown
 Fryerstown
 Glenluce
 Guildford
 Muckleford South
 Newstead*
 Sandon
 Strangways
 Strathlea
 Tarilta
 Vaughan
 Welshmans Reef
 Werona
 Yandoit Hills
 Yapeen

* Council seat.

Population

* Estimate in the 1958 Victorian Year Book.

References

External links
 Victorian Places - Newstead and Newstead Shire

Newstead